A courthouse is a building that houses a court of law; the term is most common in North America.

Courthouse may also refer to:

Court House, Arlington, Virginia, a neighborhood of Arlington, Virginia, U.S.
Courthouse (Colonial Williamsburg), part of the Williamsburg Historic District, Virginia, U.S.
Courthouse (Ljubljana), Slovenia
Courthouse (TV series), a 1995 legal drama TV series

Transportation
Court House station, in Arlington, Virginia, United States
Courthouse station (MBTA), in Boston, Massachusetts, United States
Courthouse station (San Diego Trolley), in San Diego, California, United States
Courthouse station (TRAX), in Salt Lake City, Utah, United States
Pioneer Courthouse station, in Portland, Oregon, United States

See also
 List of courthouses